The 2014–15 BNT NZ SuperTourers season was a motor racing championship for touring cars held in New Zealand. The season started on 27 September at Taupo Motorsport Park and ended on 12 April at Pukekohe Park Raceway. All cars used a chassis built by Paul Ceprnich of Pace Innovations in Australia, and were powered by a Chevrolet LS7 7-litre engine.

Previous NZ SuperTourers seasons ran over the calendar year from January to December but in 2014, the season ran from January to April in order to align with other New Zealand championship series – for 2014–15 – that are contested over the Southern Hemisphere summer. Greg Murphy started the season as the defending drivers' champion.

Team 4 Holden driver Simon Evans wrapped up the championship in an abbreviated season which saw two sprint rounds cancelled late in the season. Evans won the Sprint trophy and shared the endurance trophy with team-mate Shane van Gisbergen.

Calendar
The 2014–15 NZ SuperTourers season consisted of seven rounds when announced in April 2014, but two rounds were cancelled in February 2015 as teams pulled out of the series.

Key:

Teams and drivers

Results

Championship standings

Drivers' championship

References

External links
 

V8 Super Tourer
V8 Super Tourer